Anna Louise Lorck is a New Zealand politician of the New Zealand Labour Party. She was elected to the New Zealand House of Representatives at the 2020 general election as the MP for Tukituki.

Early life and career
Lorck grew up in Waipukurau and trained as a journalist. Before entering parliament, she owned a public relations company.

Hawkes' Bay District Health Board
Before standing as a Labour Party candidate, Lorck, who had vocally opposed Labour sacking the Hawke's Bay District Health Board (DHB), volunteered to phone canvass to motivate voter turnout for two hours for the National Party. She was never a member of the party. 

In 2019 Lorck was elected to the Hawke's Bay DHB, as the highest polling new candidate. She served as part of the governance of the region's response to COVID-19. Lorck advocates for a local cardiology centre, costed at $15 million, to enable life-saving surgery locally.

Political career

Labour parliamentary candidate, 2014–2020

At the  election, Lorck, a Hastings business woman, stood as a candidate in the  electorate for the Labour Party, and did not stand on the Labour list. As a first time candidate she made significant progress into the margin against incumbent Craig Foss, and  announced she would stand again at the  election. She was ranked 46 on the Labour party list.

During a tightly fought contest, in July 2017 a complaint by a right-wing blogger, was made against Lorck to the Advertising Standards Authority over her billboard wording of "Your Local MP". Lorck responded by stating the intention of the message was to convey that she lived in the Tukituki electorate while National candidate Lawrence Yule lived in neighboring Napier. Lorck again made significant inroads into the majority but was not elected, nor ranked high enough on the Labour list to be elected to Parliament.

At the 2020 general election, Lorck was selected as the Labour candidate for Tukituki for the third time. She was given the Labour Party's endorsement to run a local MP campaign and consequently was not on the party list. This time she unseated Yule by a margin of 1590 votes, returning the electorate to Labour for the first time since 2002.

Member of Parliament
In August 2022, a former senior staffer within the New Zealand Parliament alleged that Lorck had bullied her, and that Lorck had been through three executive assistants in a year and a half. In September 2022, a second former staffer made allegations of bullying including "persistent scolding" against Lorck. In response to media coverage, Lorck confirmed that she was undergoing leadership training and claimed that she had never received complaints of bullying from the staffer during their employment period.

Personal life 
Lorck is married to Hastings District Councillor Damon Harvey. They have a blended family of five children.

References

Living people
New Zealand socialists
New Zealand Labour Party MPs
Members of the New Zealand House of Representatives
21st-century New Zealand women politicians
New Zealand MPs for North Island electorates
Women members of the New Zealand House of Representatives
Unsuccessful candidates in the 2014 New Zealand general election
Unsuccessful candidates in the 2017 New Zealand general election
Hawke's Bay District Health Board members
Year of birth missing (living people)